The National Bus Company (NBC) was a nationalised bus company that operated in England and Wales between 1969 and 1988. NBC did not run buses itself, but was the owner of a number of regional subsidiary bus operating companies.

History

Background
Following the Labour Party victory at the 1966 General Election, Barbara Castle was appointed Minister for Transport. Castle immediately ordered a review of public transport, with a view to formulating a new transport policy.

Among the issues to be tackled were the ownership and operation of bus services, which were rapidly losing patronage and profitability due to increased prevalence of private motor cars. The state owned a considerable proportion of scheduled bus operators outside the major cities, having obtained the Tilling Group companies in 1948 as a byproduct of nationalising the railways. The Tilling Group was subsequently placed under the ownership of the nationalised Transport Holding Company (THC). London Transport was also nationalised in 1948 and others voluntarily acquiesced, the last being Red & White in 1950. When the Labour Party suddenly lost power to the Conservatives in 1951, the nationalization programme remained unfinished.

Castle proposed forming regional transport authorities, which would take over the THC subsidiaries and municipal transport undertakings in their area, and would also have the power to acquire private bus operators. However, in November 1967 British Electric Traction (BET) unexpectedly offered to sell its bus operations to the government. BET, who had been the only major private bus operating group, received £35 million for its 25 provincial bus companies and 11,300 vehicles. The deal meant that the state or municipal bus operators now operated some 90% of scheduled bus services in England and Wales. Instead of forming the regional authorities, the government published a white paper proposing the merger of the THC and BET organisations into a single National Bus Company.

The recommendations of the White Paper formed part of the Transport Act 1968. The 1968 Act also reorganised the already nationalised bus operation in Scotland, where subsidiaries formed the Scottish Bus Group.

Formation
The National Bus Company was formed on 1 January 1969.

In 1970, the company was enlarged when it acquired the country area buses of London Transport (as London Country Bus Services), the bus operations of the county boroughs of Exeter and Luton, and the Gosport & Fareham Omnibus Company, trading under the name of Provincial.

Buses were operated by locally managed subsidiary companies, with their own fleetnames and liveries. In the early years of the company, there was some rationalisation, generally leading to the amalgamation of operators into larger units and the transfer of areas between them. One was the merging of Aldershot & District with Thames Valley on 1 January 1972. Another example was the transfer of the 'land-locked' Trowbridge operations from Western National to Bristol Omnibus in 1970.

Corporate identity

Following the appointment of Fred Wood as chairman in 1972, the National Bus Company introduced a corporate identity designed by Norman Wilson, who had previously designed logos for Wood's Croda International chemical company. Henceforth, its coaches were branded as National Travel and painted in unrelieved white, with the NBC logo and the 'NATIONAL' name in alternate red & blue letters. The services were rebranded as National Express soon afterwards. The addition of blue and white stripes appeared in 1978. National Travel was the country's first attempt at a uniformly marketable express network, which superseded Associated Motorways and the plethora of other services provided by individual NBC subsidiaries. The coaches were managed by a few areas and included travel agent booking offices based at major bus stations. A hub and spoke system operated with the main hub at Cheltenham.

Around the same time, the company launched a wide number of UK holiday services under the banner "National Holidays". This brand and its travel agent booking offices existed until the mid-1990s, when the coach holiday division closed.

The National Express overseas travel business was re-launched under the name Eurolines: this brand now operates services from the UK across Europe, booked through the main National Express website.

In the 1970s all local service buses adopted a uniform design, generally in either leaf green or poppy red, initially with white relief, and bearing the company fleetname in white Akzidenz-Grotesk typeface with the new NBC "double-N" arrow logo. There were, however, exceptions: buses operating in the area of the Tyne and Wear Passenger Transport Executive became yellow in a similar fashion to the PTE's own fleet but to the NBC design; some buses operating within West Yorkshire were liveried in WYPTE verona green and cream; Jones (Aberbeeg) and Midland General both liveried in blue until 1980, and the Northern General subsidiary, Sunderland District, also retained blue for a short period.

Area of operation
Although NBC operated throughout England and Wales, it was not a monopoly. Services were provided by London Transport in Greater London, the fleets of the municipal bus companies and passenger transport executives, and by independent operators in some rural areas and a few small towns.

Bus manufacture

The NBC inherited from the Transport Holding Company 75% shareholdings in chassis manufacturer Bristol Commercial Vehicles and body builder Eastern Coach Works. In 1969 NBC formed a joint venture with British Leyland (who owned the other 25% of Bristol and ECW), by means of which British Leyland became a 50% owner of the NBC's manufacturing companies. The joint venture designed and built a new single-deck bus, the Leyland National. The first was delivered in 1972, and it remained in production until 1986. The National was also available to other bus operators. In 1982 NBC sold its 50% interest in the joint venture (including Bristol and ECW) to British Leyland.

Service reforms
IIn the late 1970’s and early 1980’s services were reviewed under a process known within instigator Midland Red as the Viable Network Project and subsequently more generally as the "Market Analysis Project" (MAP). This followed on from the West Oxfordshire Market Analysis Project conducted in 1975 by the newly formed Public Transport Unit of Oxfordshire County Council. With an all-county remit Oxfordshire included services from the Banbury area running into the West Oxfordshire survey area.  Having assisted in the programme and been fully informed as to the findings, the Midland Red Area Manager (Brian Barrett) was able to recommend that the programme should be extended elsewhere within National Bus Company. Conscious of the very limited information on their market (their passengers), NBC extended the programme throughout the areas served by the subsidiary Companies. Each company carefully considered its existing and potential new demands, surveyed both on and off bus, and recast local networks to reflect the results, indicating to local authorities those services requiring subsidy. As part of the MAP local area identities were invariably introduced, with new fleet names applied to buses, bus stops, timetables and publicity. The process culminated in the splitting of several larger NBC subsidiaries.

Deregulation and privatisation

From 1986, bus services in the UK were deregulated and progressively privatised, with the remaining larger companies forcibly broken up.

NBC was divided into 70 units, with the first sale being of National Holidays to Pleasurama in July 1986. The last sale was completed in April 1988.

The sales spawned a renewed interest in individual liveries and the "double-N" logo disappeared. However, it was kept by National Express when it was sold to their management and continued to be used until 2003, when the NBC logo finally disappeared in favour of a new logo, since replaced in 2007. Most local companies passed from state control to management buyouts. The independence of many however, was short lived, as they were acquired by the emerging large private bus groups, represented today by:
Abellio
Arriva
FirstGroup
Go-Ahead Group
National Express
RATP Group
Stagecoach Group
Transdev

Subsidiaries

Original companies
The original bus and coach operating subsidiaries of the National Bus Company in 1969 and 1970 were:

Aldershot & District Traction Co. Ltd. - Merged into Thames Valley & Aldershot 1972.
Bath Services (i.e. Bath Electric Tramways Ltd. and Bath Tramways Motor Co. Ltd.) - Bristol subsidiaries, absorbed by Bristol 1969.
Black & White Motorways Ltd. (coaches only) - Merged into National Travel (South West) 1974.
Brighton, Hove & District Omnibus Co. Ltd. - Absorbed by Southdown 1969.
Bristol Omnibus Co. Ltd., including Bristol Joint Services (a joint undertaking of the company and Bristol City Council) and services leased from the county borough of Gloucester, operated under the Gloucester fleetname.
Charlie's Cars (Bournemouth) Ltd. (coaches only) - Shamrock & Rambler subsidiary, absorbed by Shamrock & Rambler 1972.
Cheltenham District Traction Co. Ltd. - Bristol subsidiary.
County Motors (Lepton) Ltd. - Jointly owned by West Riding, Yorkshire Traction and Yorkshire Woollen, absorbed by Yorkshire Traction 1969.
Crosville Motor Services Ltd.
Cumberland Motor Services Ltd.
Devon General Omnibus & Touring Co. Ltd., including Grey Cars coach operation. Absorbed by Western National 1971.
East Kent Road Car Co. Ltd.
East Midland Motor Services Ltd.
East Yorkshire Motor Services Ltd.
Eastern Counties Omnibus Co. Ltd.
Eastern National Omnibus Co. Ltd.
Gateshead & District Omnibus Co. Ltd. - Northern General subsidiary, absorbed by Northern General 1976.
Greenslade's Tours Ltd. (coaches only) - Devon General subsidiary, merged into National Travel (South West) 1974.
Hants & Dorset Motor Services Ltd.
Hebble Motor Services Ltd. - Became part of West Riding group in 1969 and absorbed Yorkshire Woollen's coach fleet in 1970.  Bus operations were transferred to West Yorkshire and the Halifax Joint Omnibus Committee in 1970 and 1971 respectively. Hebble thereafter operated coaches only. Merged into National Travel (North East) 1974.
Jones Omnibus Services Ltd. Independent operator acquired in 1969 and operated as a subsidiary of Red & White.  Became part of Western Welsh group 1974. Merged into National Welsh in 1978.
Keighley-West Yorkshire Services Ltd. - Jointly owned by West Yorkshire and the Borough of Keighley. Absorbed by West Yorkshire in 1974.
Lincolnshire Road Car Co. Ltd.
London Country - Established on 1 January 1970 to take over the country area services of London Transport).  Included Green Line coach services.
Maidstone & District Motor Services Ltd.
Mansfield District Traction Co. Ltd. - Midland General subsidiary, absorbed by East Midland 1972.
Mexborough & Swinton Traction Co. Ltd. – Absorbed by Yorkshire Traction 1969
Midland General Omnibus Co. Ltd. - Absorbed by Trent in 1972.
Midland Red (i.e. Birmingham & Midland Motor Omnibus Co. Ltd.) - Renamed Midland Red Omnibus Co. Ltd. in March 1974.
Neath & Cardiff Luxury Coaches Ltd. (coaches only) Split between Western Welsh and South Wales in 1970-71.
Notts & Derby (i.e. Nottinghamshire & Derbyshire Traction Co. Ltd.) - Midland General subsidiary, absorbed by Trent in 1972.
North Western Road Car Co. Ltd. - Bus operations split between SELNEC PTE, Crosville and Trent in 1972. North Western thereafter operated coaches only. Renamed National Travel (North West) in 1974.
Northern General Transport Co. Ltd.
Oxford (i.e. City of Oxford Motor Services Ltd.
Potteries Motor Traction Co. Ltd.
Provincial (i.e. Gosport & Fareham Omnibus Co. Ltd.) - Acquired from the Swaine Group on 1 January 1970 and operated as a Hants & Dorset subsidiary.
Red & White Services Ltd. - Became part of Western Welsh group from 1974.  Merged into National Welsh 1978.
Rhondda Transport Co. Ltd. - Absorbed by Western Welsh 1971.
Ribble Motor Services Ltd.
Samuelson New Transport Co. Ltd. (coaches only) - Merged into National Travel (South East) 1974.
Shamrock & Rambler Motor Coaches Ltd. (coaches only) - Hants & Dorset subsidiary, merged into National Travel (South West) 1974.
Sheffield United Tours Ltd. (coaches only) - Merged into National Travel (North East) 1974.
South Wales Transport Co. Ltd.
Southdown Motor Services Ltd.
Southern National Omnibus Co. Ltd. – Absorbed by Western National 1969.
Southern Vectis Omnibus Co. Ltd., including Crinage's and Fountain Coaches coaching units.
W. C. Standerwick Ltd. (coaches only).  Ribble subsidiary, absorbed by National Travel (North West)  1974.
Stratford Blue (i.e. Stratford-upon-Avon Blue Motors Ltd.) - Midland Red subsidiary, absorbed by Midland Red 1971.
Sunderland District Omnibus Co. Ltd. - Northern General subsidiary, absorbed by Northern General 1975.
Thames Valley Traction Co. Ltd., including South Midland coach unit.  South Midland transferred to City of Oxford in 1971, Thames Valley merged into Thames Valley & Aldershot 1972.
Thomas Bros. (Port Talbot) Ltd. - Absorbed by South Wales in 1971.
Tilling's Travel (NBC) Ltd. (coaches only) - Eastern National subsidiary, absorbed by Eastern National in 1970 but re-established in 1971.  Merged into National Travel (South East) 1974.
A. Timpson & Sons Ltd. (coaches only) - Merged into National Travel (South East) 1974.
Trent Motor Traction Co. Ltd.
Tyneside Omnibus Co. Ltd. - Northern General subsidiary, absorbed by Northern General  1976.
Tynemouth & District Transport Co. Ltd. - Northern General subsidiary, absorbed by Northern General 1975.
United Automobile Services Ltd.
United Counties Omnibus Co. Ltd.
United Welsh Services Ltd. - Absorbed by South Wales in 1971
Venture Transport Co. Ltd. - Aacquired by NBC in 1970 and became a Northern General subsidiary.  Absorbed by Northern General in 1975.
West Riding Automobile Co. Ltd.
West Yorkshire Road Car Co. Ltd., including operation of York-West Yorkshire Joint Committee services provided on behalf of the County Borough of York.
Wakefield's Motors Ltd. (coaches only) - Tynemouth & District subsidiary, absorbed by Tynemouth & District 1970.
Western National Omnibus Co. Ltd., including Royal Blue  coach operation joint with Southern National.
Western Welsh Omnibus Co. Ltd.
Wilts & Dorset Motor Services Ltd. - Hants & Dorset subsidiary, absorbed by Hants & Dorset in 1972.
Yorkshire Traction Co. Ltd.
Yorkshire Woollen District Transport Co. Ltd. Became part of West Riding group in 1969.

In addition, another NBC subsidiary Amalgamated Passenger Transport Ltd. inherited the former British Railways/THC shareholdings in several further Joint Omnibus Committees in Yorkshire, comprising Halifac JOC and Todmorden JOC (merged to form Calderdale JOC in 1971), Huddersfield JOC and Sheffield JOC.

Consolidation
During its early years, NBC pursued a policy of merging smaller subsidiaries to form larger regional companies.  At the same time, some depots were transferred between subsidiaries to reduce overlap between operating territories.  In addition to those businesses inherited from the Transport Holding Company, NBC took over the municipal bus operations in Exeter and Luton during 1970, with these operations being absorbed by Devon General and United Counties respectively, while the country area services of London Transport also passed to NBC in 1970 as London Country.  Notable independent operators acquired during this period included Jones of Aberbeeg, Venture of Consett, Provincial of Fareham, and Wessex of Bristol which were (at least initially) retained as subsidiaries.  1974 saw the coach-only subsidiaries consolidated into four "National Travel" companies, while a fifth was established to take over another independent coach operator, Don Everall of Wolverhampton.

On the other hand, the NBC shareholdings in Huddesfield and Sheffield JOCs were sold to the respective local authorities in 1969, and most of Hebble's bus operations passed to the jointly owned Halifax JOC during 1970.  The 1968 Transport Act gave the new passenger transport executives the right to purchase any bus operations within their territories, including those of the National Bus Company.  Not all of the PTEs chose to exercise this power, but on 1 January 1972 SELNEC PTE purchased the majority of North Western Road Car, and in 1973 the services of Midland Red within the West Midlands PTE are passed to that executive.  In 1974 the remaining NBC interest in Calderdale JOC was acquired by the newly-formed West Yorkshire PTE.

By 1978 the following bus-operating companies existed:
Alder Valley – formed 1 January 1972 from Aldershot & District and Thames Valley
Bristol – absorbed Cheltenham District Traction in 1975, separate "Cheltenham" fleetname retained
Crosville
Cumberland
Devon General became subsidiary of Western National in 1971
East Kent
East Midland – absorbed Mansfield District in 1975, separate "Mansfield" fleetname retained
East Yorkshire
Eastern Counties
Eastern National
Hants & Dorset – absorbed Wilts & Dorset 1972
Jones (finally absorbed by National Welsh 1980)
Lincolnshire
London Country
Maidstone & District
Midland Red (Birmingham and Midland Motor Omnibus Company) – absorbed Stratford Blue 1971
National Travel London – formed 1974 from Samuelson, Timpson's and Tillings (as National Travel South East), renamed 1978
National Travel East – formed 1973 (as National Travel North East) from Hebble, Sheffield United Tours, renamed 1977
National Travel South West – formed 1973 from Black & White, Greenslades, Grey Cars
National Travel West formed 1977 from National Travel North West (formed 1974 from Standerwick) and National Travel Midlands (formed 1973 from part of former South Midland)
National Welsh  – formed 1978 from Western Welsh (which had absorbed Rhondda in 1971 and Red and White
Northern General – absorbed Sunderland District, Tynemouth & District,  Venture 1975; absorbed Tyneside, Gateshead & District 1976
Oxford (City of Oxford Motor Services) – absorbed South Midland January 1971
Potteries Motor Traction
Provincial (Gosport & Fareham Omnibus Company)
Ribble
South Wales – absorbed Neath & Cardiff, Thomas Bros, United Welsh 1971
Southdown – absorbed Brighton, Hove & District, March 1974
Southern Vectis
Trent Motor Traction, absorbed Midland General 1971
United Automobile Services
United Counties
West Riding
West Yorkshire
Western National
Yorkshire Traction
Yorkshire Woollen – under West Riding management

Break-up and privatisation
In 1981 Midland Red, weakened by losing its core area, was broken into six smaller operating companies. Most of the National Travel companies were closed down in the mid-1980s, with coaches mainly going to local bus companies. Wessex National was formed from part of National Travel South West, and Pilgrim Coaches from part of National Travel West.

In preparation for the introduction of deregulation in 1986, and for privatisation soon after, many of the companies were broken up into smaller units. In some cases the names of earlier companies – such as Wilts & Dorset or North Western – were revived, although often with quite different areas from their namesakes.

Two additional non-bus-operating subsidiaries were also disposed of in 1988:
National Express Limited was sold to its management.
Victoria Coach Station Limited passed to the state-owned London Transport.

The Scarborough operations of United Automobile Services passed to East Yorkshire Motor Services in September 1986.

References

Sources

Stewart J Brown, NBC: antecedents and formation, Shepperton, 1983
D R Kennedy and A Kennedy, National Bus Company 1981, Oxford, 1982
Ray Stenning, A National Bus Company Album, Wiveliscombe, 1979
Ray Stenning, The Years before National 1948 – 1968, Swindon, 1982

Former bus operators in the United Kingdom
Former nationalised industries of the United Kingdom
British companies established in 1969
British companies disestablished in 1988
1969 establishments in the United Kingdom
1988 disestablishments in the United Kingdom
Holding companies of the United Kingdom